Frank Hereford may refer to:
 Frank Hereford (politician), U.S. representative and senator from West Virginia
 Frank Hereford (university president), president of the University of Virginia
 Frank H. Hereford, attorney and member of the Arizona constitutional convention